The 9th arrondissement of Marseille is one of 16 arrondissements of Marseille. This district is the largest in the city. The 9th arrondissement borders the 8th, 10th and 11th arrondissements. It is governed locally together with the 10th arrondissement, with which it forms the 5th sector of Marseille.

Neighbourhoods
The district is divided into nine neighbourhoods: Les Baumettes, Le Cabot, Carpiagne, La Panouse, Le Redon (comprising Luminy), Mazargues, Sainte-Marguerite, Sormiou, Vaufrèges, along with multiple smaller sized lots. The arrondissement also contains part of the Massif des Calanques.

Public transport
The 9th district has two subway stations, part of the Marseille Metro.

 Rond-Point du Prado
 Sainte-Marguerite Dromel

Principal landmarks

 The Mazargues obelisk
 The Mazargues War Cemetery, a Commonwealth War Graves Commission burial ground, is located on Avenue General de Lattre de Tassigny.

Demography

Population of the neighbourhoods

Education and training by neighbourhood in 2006

Unemployment rate by neighbourhood in 2006

Beneficiaries of supplementary universal health coverage (CMU-C) by neighbourhood

Supplementary CMU (CMU-C) is a free complementary health plan that covers what is not covered by compulsory health insurance schemes.

Beneficiaries of the CMU-C by IRIS in 2008

Families by neighbourhood in 2006 
Single parent families and families with four children at 1 January 2006

Dwellings by neighbourhood at 8/3/1999

Population of neighbourhood by age at 8/3/1999

References

External links
 Official website
 Dossier complet, INSEE

9th arrondissement of Marseille
09